Marty Bass is a television news personality and weather man for CBS-owned WJZ 13 in Baltimore, Maryland. Noted for his strong accent and ebullient personality, Bass is a longtime fixture of the station's morning show. For most of his career, Marty was paired with anchor Don Scott, who retired in 2014.

Solicitation arrest
In late 1985, Bass was arrested for soliciting lewdness, essentially soliciting a prostitute. According to reports, on December 4, 1985, Bass solicited a female undercover police officer in Baltimore's Patterson Park. The undercover cop testified Bass requested oral sex. Bass reportedly countered that he asked to "get into her head." Bass was suspended from WJZ-TV until early 1986.

Baldness
On February 9, 2006, Bass addressed a notable piece of Baltimore folklore - the disappearance of his toupee in 1986.

As part of local public radio station WYPR's Stoop Storytelling Series, Bass told the story of how he began to go bald in his early/mid-20s, and that his TV news directors insisted that he wear a hairpiece. After years of wearing a toupee, Bass finally decided to appear on WJZ without a toupee in 1984. He went on vacation with a hairpiece, and returned from vacation without a hairpiece. The "news" story on Marty's missing hair was carried worldwide by Associated Press and UPI. Bass recalled that eventually, he and WJZ decided to "retire" the old toupee to Boca Raton, Florida ("Where the other retired Northwest Baltimore hairpieces go.") and that it was flown, first class, to Florida by Piedmont Airlines.

Personal
Bass lives in Brooklandville, Maryland, with his wife, Sharon, and their two children.

Sources

Television anchors from Baltimore
Candidates in the 2008 United States presidential election
21st-century American politicians
Living people
Politicians from Baltimore
Year of birth missing (living people)